Wilfreda Beehive is a bus and coach operator based in Adwick-le-Street, Doncaster.

History

Wilfreda Luxury Coaches was formed in 1949 by Bill and Marie Scholey. They took the name from a coach they bought from Wilfred Graham, a taxi operator in Doncaster who named his daughter Wilfreda and then named a coach after her.

At first, the company operated coach services from a depot at Ranskill, near Bawtry. In 1987 it acquired the Adwick-le-Street business of E.A. Hart trading as Beehive Services, becoming Wilfreda Beehive, growing its fleet from nine to 23 coaches. Between 1993 and 1998 it operated many bus services, but sold them and its service buses to Mainline Group just before the latter was absorbed by First South Yorkshire in 1998.

In 2001 Wilfreda began operating service buses again. It operates a mixed fleet ranging from modern high quality coaches to old double-deckers. Many of its routes are school services or South Yorkshire Passenger Transport Executive contracts, a large number of which have been won from other operators in recent years. However, it more recently has restarted operating competitive commercial services, such as the 52. In 2006, the company took over Eagre Coaches, Gainsborough which runs many coach tours and holidays.

In 2012 the company stopped all bus services

As of 2023, the company remains in family ownership, managed by the founders' grandson Peter Scholey.

Fleet
As at October 2013 the fleet consisted of 40 buses and coaches.

See also
List of bus operators of the United Kingdom

References

External links
Company website
www.eagre.co.uk/ 
Flickr gallery

Coach operators in England
Bus operators in South Yorkshire
Bus transport in Doncaster